The women's 800 metre freestyle competition of the swimming event at the 2015 Southeast Asian Games was held on 6 June at the OCBC Aquatic Centre in the Singapore Sports Hub in Kallang, Singapore.

Schedule

Records 

The following records were established during the competition:

Results

Final 1

Final 2

Overall Final Ranking

References

External links
 

Women's 800 metre freestyle
Women's sports competitions in Singapore
2015 in women's swimming